"Stay Girl Stay Pure" (Japanese: ステイ・ガール・ステイ・ピュア) is a single by 1986 Omega Tribe released on November 18, 1987 by VAP. The single charted at No. 5 on the Oricon charts.

Background 
The single was the last to be listed under "1986 Omega Tribe", being used as the opening of the Nippon TV drama Koi wa Hi-ho!. The single would later be included in the album Down Town Mystery after they renamed to Carlos Toshiki & Omega Tribe. It would also be included in the compilation album Omega Tribe History: Goodbye Omega Tribe 1983–1991. With the song, the band appeared at The Best Ten for the first time in a while, but with limited appearances. There are a total of four versions of the song: the single version, the "Daylight" version, the "Night Time" version, and the "Best Remix" version. The title of the track has also changed, with some albums stating the title as "Stay girl Stay pure."

The B-side, "Sand On The Beach," was composed by the band's guitarist, Shinji Takashima, having all the band members compose at least one track during the group's time. It was not included in any album except for the compilation album Our Graduation.

Track listing

Single

Soundtrack appearances 
The song was covered by the vocalist Carlos Toshiki with his new band, B-EDGE, on their 2018 album Nova Nostalga.
The song was sampled by future funk artists such as Night Tempo and Vantage.

Charts

References

Notes 

Omega Tribe (Japanese band) songs